Inglewhite Congregational Church is a church building located in the English village of Inglewhite, Lancashire. A Grade II listed building, it was constructed in 1826, seven years after the founding of the church.

The church is in sandstone, partly rendered, with quoins and a slate roof.  It has a rectangular plan, with an extension on the side.  There is a gabled symmetrical front that has a round-headed doorway with an inscription in the head, imposts, and a fanlight.  There are two round-headed windows above, and larger round-headed windows on the sides and rear.

In 2011, Preston City Council designated the church as one of eight buildings in the village to be sites of special interest.

See also
Listed buildings in Goosnargh

References

Sources

External links
Inglewhite Church official website
Inglewhite Church – Lancashire Online Parish Clerk

Churches in the City of Preston
1819 establishments in England
Churches completed in 1826
19th-century churches in the United Kingdom
Grade II listed churches in Lancashire
Goosnargh